Todd Michael Haney (born July 30, 1965) is a former second baseman in Major League Baseball who played for the Montreal Expos, Chicago Cubs and New York Mets in parts of five seasons spanning 1992–1998. LIsted at 5' 9", 165 lb., Haney batted and threw right-handed. He was born in Galveston, Texas.

Haney attended University of Texas at Austin, where he reached the College World Series while playing for the Texas Longhorns. In 1985, he played collegiate summer baseball with the Harwich Mariners of the Cape Cod Baseball League, and returned to the league in 1986 to play for the Orleans Cardinals. He was selected by the Seattle Mariners in the 38th round of the 1987 MLB Draft.

Haney worked as an instructor for a Waco-based select baseball team, the Waco Storm.

Haney has been Head Coach of the Victoria HarbourCats of the West Coast League since 2019, leading the team in the 2019 and 2022 seasons. The team did not operate during the pandemic. Haney was assistant coach of the HarbourCats in the 2018 season.

References

External links

Retrosheet
The Baseball Gauge
Venezuela Winter League

1965 births
Living people
American expatriate baseball players in Canada
Baseball players from Texas
Bellingham Mariners players
Calgary Cannons players
Chicago Cubs players
Harwich Mariners players
Indianapolis Indians players
Iowa Cubs players
Leones del Caracas players
American expatriate baseball players in Venezuela
Major League Baseball second basemen
Montreal Expos players
New Orleans Zephyrs players
New York Mets players
Norfolk Tides players
Orleans Firebirds players
Ottawa Lynx players
Panola Ponies baseball players
San Bernardino Spirit players
St. Lucie Mets players
Sportspeople from Galveston, Texas
Tacoma Rainiers players
Texas Longhorns baseball players
Wausau Timbers players
Williamsport Bills players